From an articulatory perspective, phonemes can be described as front or back.  Front vowels refer to vowels articulated towards the front of the mouth. This can either refer to vowels that are more front than central or, more rarely, only to fully front vowels, i.e. the ones that are articulated as far forward as possible in the mouth. A similar distinction holds for back vowels, which can refer to vowels that are more back than central or, more rarely, only to fully back vowels, i.e. the ones that are articulated as back as possible in the mouth. However, acoustically there is little difference between a central vowel and a back vowel, with the result that the two are frequently grouped together into an even broader category of "back vowels", or a category of "non-front vowels".

A back consonant includes all consonants whose place of articulation is in the soft palate (velum) or farther back, including velar, uvular, pharyngeal, and glottal consonants.  From the perspective of primary places of articulation, this includes all of the laryngeal consonants and some of the dorsal consonants (specifically, excluding palatal consonants).

A front consonant includes all consonants that are not back consonants, including palatal, coronal, and labial consonants.

Front and back vowels are also known as acute and grave vowels, respectively.
For consonants, however, front/back are not synonyms of acute/grave.  Grave consonants include both back consonants and labial consonants, while acute consonants include all of front consonants except labial consonants.  This suggests that a three-way division between labial, acute and back (vaguely speaking, "P-like", "T-like" and "K-like", respectively) might be useful in some contexts.

See also
Fronted (phonetics)

References
Jacobson, Roman; On Language. Harvard University Press, 1990 p. 260

Phonology